The Company (stylized as The CompanY) is a Filipino vocal group since 1985. The current members are Moy Ortiz, Annie Quintos, Sweet Collado-Plantado and OJ Mariano.

History
The original members of The CompanY were members of the 1981 and 1983 touring batches of the Ateneo College Glee Club. Their musical director, Moy Ortiz, named the group after Stephen Sondheim's musical Company. The group focused on contemporary jazz and a cappella music, instead of songs from the classical and traditional choral music repertoire that they performed under the ACGC.

The CompanY scored their first hit with the single "Everlasting Love", which Ortiz co-wrote with Luigi de Dios and Rina Caniza. This was followed in 1992 by two other hits,“Muntik na Kitang Minahal" (I Almost Loved You) and “Now That I Have You”, from their second album Sixby6. That same year, the group performed in their major concert with the Manhattan Transfer at the Araneta Coliseum.

In 2014, The Company welcomed OJ Mariano as their newest member, replacing Jay Marquez.

Musical influence
In The Company's existence in the music industry, the group made their distinct sound with the influence of different artists and groups, such as Pentatonix, The Manhattan Transfer, New York Voices, The Singers Unlimited, The Carpenters, Swingle Singers, Swing Out Sister, Pizzicato Five, Burt Bacharach, Take 6, First Call, Fifth Dimension, Jimmy Webb, Paul Williams, The Corrs, and Destiny's Child.

Members
The current members of The CompanY are:

The founding members were:

Moy Ortiz
Annie Quintos
Kathleen Ng
Joji Inocentes
Manny Eulalia
Malou Diaz
Tetet Tolentino
Max Aviola
Tom Calisterio
Bob Acot
Kelly Reyes
Reggie Reyes
Carol Menguito

Other former members include:
Andre Castillo
Arsenio Cruz
Meus Bartolome Kaveny
Reuben Laurente
Jay Marquez
Mary Anne Morales
Febe Magbanua Pantoja
Cecile Bautista

Awards

Awit Awards

1991 - Best Performance by a new duo or group, "Everlasting Love"
1991 - Best Performance by a duo or group, "Everlasting Love"
1991 - Best Composition, "Everlasting Love"
1992 - Best Vocal Jazz Recording, "Ikaw Na Ikaw"
1992 - Best Inspirational Recording, "Hanggang sa Muli"
1992 - Album of the Year, Six by 6
1993 - Philip's International Award, "When the Feeling's Right"
1994 - Best Traditional Recording, "Kahit Ika'y Panaginip Lang"
1994 - Best Vocal Arrangement, "Kahit Ika'y Panaginip Lang"
1994 - Best Instrumental Arrangement, "Kanin, Ulam, Sabaw at Ikaw"
1995 - Best Instrumental Arrangement Accompanyinh Vocals, "Ihip ng Hangin"
1997 - Best Vocal Jazz Recording, "Bawal ang Goodbye"
1998 - Best Vocal Jazz Recording, "After You"
2002 - Best Duo/Group Recording, "Gusto Ko ng Acapella"
2008 - Best Vocal Arrangement, "Souvenirs" (Moy Ortiz)
2007 - Best Christmas Recording, "Noche Buena"
2007 - Best Vocal Arrangement, "The (Not So) Little Drummer Boy" (Moy Ortiz)
2013 - Best Collaboration, for "With a Little Help from My Friends", The CompanY and Tria Bascon
2013 - Best World Music Recording - "Pinoy Na Krismas"

Discography

Albums

Yon Na! (1991)
Six by 6 (1992)
Christmas CompanY (1993)
HarmonY (1994)
For the Long Run (1995)
STRETCH (1996)
Greatest Hits (1997)
RecycleDeluxe (1998)
RecycleDeluxe II (1999)
Storybook (2001)
Greatest Hits . The Legend Series (2001)
Live at the CCP! (2003)
Mahal Kong Radyo (2004)
The AnthologY. 20th Anniversary Celebration (2005)
2 in 1 Series (2005)
The Christmas Album (2006)
Sing Like a Champion (DVD, 2006)
Destination Bossa (2007)
Group Hug (with Gerard Salonga and FILharmoniKA, 2008)
Lighthearted (2010)
The Definitive Collection (2010)
Lighthearted 2  (2012)
Lighthearted OPM (2013)
Lighthearted OPM 2 (2014)
Nostalgia (2016)
Nostalgia 2 (2017)
Better Together (2017) - collaboration with The New Minstrels

Singles
"The Lord's Prayer" - digital single (2018)
"You Just Know It's Christmas" - digital single (2018)
"Love is Love is Love" - digital single (2018)
"'Sang Tawag Mo Lang" featuring Ryan Cayabyab - digital single (2019)
"I-Boogie Mo Ako Baby" - The CompanY & The Itchyworms - digital single (2020)
"I-Remix Mo Ako Baby" - The CompanY & The Itchyworms featuring The 123 Force, Moy Ortiz, DJ Soxialism, DJ M.O.D., Mumuy, Josh Evangelista (2020)
"Prutas Pilipinas" featuring Ryan Cayabyab- 2020

References

External links
The CompanY - official website

1985 establishments in the Philippines
Filipino choirs
Filipino pop music groups
Musical groups established in 1985
Musical quintets
Star Music artists
Vocal quartets